Nocturne is the debut studio album by American metal band The Human Abstract. It was recorded at The Basement in Rural Hall, North Carolina and Trax East in South River, New Jersey. On the band's MySpace page, as well as in the Metal=Life compilation CD, the last 30 or so seconds of "Desiderata" are included as part of the intro to "Vela, Together We Await the Storm". Music videos were made for "Crossing the Rubicon" (directed by Darren Doane) and "Vela, Together We Await the Storm" (directed by Michael Grodner). Nocturne has sold roughly 40,000 units in the USA since its release in August 2006.

Track listing

Personnel
Nathan Ells – vocals, lyrics
A.J. Minette – guitar, piano
Dean Herrera – guitar
Kenny Arehart – bass
Brett Powell – drums
Sons of Nero – artwork

In popular culture
An 8-bit remix of "Crossing the Rubicon" is used as the theme song for the Angry Joe Show, an internet video game review series hosted by Joe Vargas.

References

2006 debut albums
The Human Abstract (band) albums
Albums with cover art by Sons of Nero
Hopeless Records albums
Albums produced by Jamie King (record producer)